Battlement is the only official studio album by the German progressive rock band Neuschwanstein. It is still considered one of the most remarkable German productions of this genre of the late 1970s. The album's importance to the progressive rock scene is also evident from the fact that there are hundreds of articles, reviews and blogs on Battlement worldwide, from North and South America, throughout Western and Eastern Europe, to Central and East Asia.

Personnel
 Thomas Neuroth – keyboards
 Klaus Mayer – flute
 Roger Weiler – electric guitar
 Rainer Zimmer – bass
 Hans Peter Schwarz – drums
 Frédéric Joos – vocals

Track listing

The album was released both on LP and CD. "Midsummer Day" is only available as a bonus track on CD.

History 
In the early 1970s, Thomas Neuroth and Klaus Mayer formed the band Neuschwanstein. Enthused by King Crimson and Rick Wakeman, they initially performed as a cover band, with a repertoire also including classical and baroque adaptations. After several line-up changes, a stable line-up crystallised in early 1974, consisting of Thomas Neuroth (keyboards), Klaus Mayer (flute), Udo Redlich (electric guitar), Uli Limpert (electric bass) and Hans Peter Schwarz (drums).

Wakeman's Journey to the Centre of the Earth was released in May 1974. This album became the initial spark for Neuschwanstein to present a similar work on stage, Alice in Wonderland. Neuschwanstein performed successfully several times with their stage show in the entire German-French border region (Saarland/Lorraine/Alsace), often in front of several thousand spectators, and thus got to play in the support of already well-known bands such as Novalis and Lucifer's Friend.

The year 1975 was to lead to another step towards professionalism. Redlich was replaced by guitarist Roger Weiler after voluntarily leaving the band and Ulli Reichert, a Saarland businessman with contacts in the music scene (Herman Rarebell, Scorpions), began to support the group not only financially.

Besides the numerous gigs with Alice in Wonderland, the group worked out new material, influenced by Genesis of the Peter Gabriel as well as by Steve Hackett. In 1976, the singer and musician Frédéric Joos, who came from near Metz (France), who had already worked with Weiler years before, was signed on to sing with Neuschwanstein, as his voice fitted the style of the band's new compositions perfectly.

Due to his connections, manager Reichert managed to get the group the chance to record their new programme in October 1978 at the Dieter Dierks Studios in Cologne-Stommelen. In just 10 days, from 21 to 31 October, the group recorded several of their favourite pieces, 6 of which eventually appeared on the album. "A Winter's Tale", composed by Joos and lyricised by Weiler, and the rather commercial song "Midsummer Day" were omitted for the final production. The band intended to release the latter on a promotional single, but financial reasons prevented them from doing so. It was only through the 1992 CD release of Musea Records that this song appeared as a bonus track.

Joos took over all the vocal parts, except for the title song "Battlement", which was written and sung by Rainer Zimmer. To give the album a professional touch and perhaps achieve greater commercial success, manager Reichert asked Scorpions drummer Herman Rarebell to re-record the drum tracks on the opener "Loafer Jack" and thus also appear in the album credits. Reichert and Rarebell, whose real name is Hermann Erbel, had known each other for some time in the Saarland music scene, where Rarebell had already made a name for himself before his involvement with the Scorpions. However, the group was not at all enthusiastic about this decision, especially since Hans Peter Schwarz had already recorded a much more subtle rhythm pattern for this track whereas Rarebell had recorded a classic rock drum kit.

The album Battlement was initially released as an LP in 1979 and sold 6000 copies in a short time. For a self-production of a band without a record deal, this is a considerable success, especially because during this time interest in progressive rock was waning considerably, with new wave and post-punk already on the rise. Despite Neuschwanstein's considerable popularity, the success of the album failed to materialise, even despite a good distribution deal with a small local label called Racket Records (not to be confused with the Marillion-owned label of the same name). Weiler later said about this:

We were exactly in the ungrateful middle with the timing: Four years earlier (1974) or four years later (1982) – and we would have been in the running! I was and still am firmly convinced of that!

A reviewer from the Netherlands writes:
It's funny that Marillion were just starting out [at the time of this release, author's note] and are considered neoprog along with a few other bands, but Neuschwanstein, who were never considered neoprog, could actually be considered neoprog pioneers. In that sense, this record sounds like a kind of pre-"Script for a Jester's Tear".

CD vs. LP 
In 1992, Roger Weiler contacted the people in charge at Musea Records and suggested that they reissue the album on CD. Musea Records, based in Metz (France), is a small label that has excelled in the distribution of progressive rock productions. The idea was put into action together with former Neuschwanstein manager Reichert, and so Reichert and Weiler remixed the original recordings for this occasion in March 1992 at Sound Factory Studios, Saarbrücken. For Musea, this re-release should pay off, as the CD would prove to be an absolute highlight and one of the most successful productions of this label.

Weiler stated in February 2022:
I was only interested in a contemporary preservation of the music and a CD was the measure of all things at that time. [...] It was important to me because I was not at all satisfied with the original mix. I wanted a more transparent sound with more dynamics. In the original mix, the bass was far too dominant for me, even though it was very well played. I thought a sound similar to Genesis would be more suitable.

The new mix, however, turned out to be extremely complicated. He also elaborated:
We experimented a lot with the remix to make it more direct and transparent – it didn't work! As soon as you left out a melody of an instrument, it was no longer the song – that actually showed the whole depth of the music as we had composed and arranged it. So in the end, all that was left in the remix was the reduction of the dominant bass playing.

This remix was not always met with undivided opinion in the progressive rock scene. The reviewer "comp of nss" wrote on Prograrchives.com:

(The) CD is not the original music, the musicians recorded on tape. The CD is a remix. Remixed by a nice producer and a Genesis fan. Without the intention, the charme and this unmistakable sound of the seventies. So, if you can, hear the vinyl. Only on vinyl "Battlement" is truthful.

Peter Thelen from Exposé online comments:
The original mix was just a little on the bassy side, so with good intentions, Musea brought the band's guitar player in to remix the album. Unfortunately, most of the bass has now been mixed out, and the vocals have been brought further to the forefront, giving the album a whole new character sounding more like Genesis […] but I must admit I'm somewhat disappointed with the remix.

Comparing the two versions, it is indeed noticeable that the bass is no longer so dominant and the treble has been raised. In addition, the sound has gained more stereo width and more reverb has been added to keyboards, flute and vocals.

Cover

Responsible for the photos of the LP cover is Werner Richner, who, like Neuschwanstein, is also from Völklingen. He was also active as a rock musician until the mid-1970s. Richner is a nationally known and successful photographer and publisher of illustrated books and has, among other things, photographed numerous castles for various illustrated books.

For the front cover of the album, Richner photographed the castle of Haut-Barr (German "Hohbarr") near Saverne (Alsace/France); the photo for the back cover of the album was taken in Greece, according to his own statements. The idea for the front cover of Battlement is based on the title song of the same name.

Critical reception (Excerpts)
Weuschka from Ukraine writes:
A true masterpiece of 1970s progressive epic-sympho rock. A German band that incorporates the best of Genesis, Camel and Eloy.

Domenico D'Alessandro from Italy comments:
This band has never known an international recognition and still is a hidden gem from German Golden Era of Prog.

The reviewer Alnilamski from USA summarizes:
This album is an absolute gem. Its acoustic sounds, along with the uncanny resemblance between the voices of Frédéric Joos and young Peter Gabriel, make Battlement sound a bit like early Genesis. However, they are by no means a direct ripoff.

An unknown reviewer from Uzbekistan comes to the following conclusion:
The release of Neuschwanstein's only album was, in my view, one of the most notable events that happened within the framework of Classic Art (Symphonic) Rock in the end of the 1970s. […] There are seven tracks on the album and five of them are real gems of Classic Symphonic Progressive. Along with "Tales From the Lush Attic" (IQ-1983) and "Somewhere But Yesterday" (Xitizen Cain-1994), Neuschwanstein's "Battlement" is one of the most successful of the genuine clone-albums that have ever been created in the history of Rock Music.

The blogger "Kaikarmanheimo" from Finland says about this:
Neuschwanstein is somewhere in the upper middle range. The band can write some great melodic passages and chord progressions and play them with the required technique and dynamics. On the other hand, the songs don't always build up into natural ensembles. And as for guitarist Roger Weiler's lyrics, the band wades into the swamp of mythical morality in somewhat shaky English […]. Somehow, a certain awkwardness and alienation always creeps into the final result.

From the Czech Republic comes a review by Jaromír Merhaut, who sums it up this way:
Neuschwanstein is not only a mesmerizing symbol of noble folly towering over the Bavarian town of Füssen, but also a band that has created one of the most beautiful art-rock records I know. It's also a story about how everything is relative and how little it means to be the new prophet if you're not in the right place at the right time… […] Even the best music in the best traditions doesn't guarantee success. It's a sad paradox that a few years later Marillion, with the same formula, raised the banner of Genesis, and almost conquered the world with it. When you put on "Beyond The Bugle" as your first Neuschwanstein song, and after the gurgling overture you hear the opening verse "Beyond the mountain, a wanderer spent the night…" delivered in Frederic Joos's wily voice, you won't believe anyone could have sung that three years before Fish. Even the music world can be so damn unfair sometimes…

The reviewer Progbear from USA writes:
Average German sympho that is somehow hyped as the ultimate Genesis clone. It’s not, it’s rather typical German prog with thin keys based around string synths and Fender Rhodes and hypnotic musical song-structures that occasionally hint at something more complex. […] According to a friend who owns the original Racket-label vinyl, the Musea edition is heavily remixed to make it sound more "symphonic". Supposedly, the original mix sounds more like Eloy and less like a lesser Novalis album with English lyrics and a different singer.

Tom Karr from USA concludes the following:
In progressive rock's glory days English and Italian, even American groups, garnered international attention for their contributions to the genre. Meanwhile, continental Europe boasted a number of fine bands, a very few well known, many who labored without the world's eye, and some who did not even make their mark on the scene until the very late 70s and into the early 1980s. […] Neuschwanstein was such a band. […] Re-released on Musea in 1992, Battlement is a beautiful, lush work, and one of the best produced and sounding independently recorded releases. […] The musicianship displayed on Battlement is absolutely top notch and vocalist/acoustic guitarist Frederic Joos will have many listeners swearing that Peter Gabriel himself provided the lead vocals for Neuschwanstein. […] Every track on this re-issue is of good quality and a couple are almost good enough to qualify as what I call could call "masterpieces". […] This is a true classic of continental progressive rock and is well deserving of the title.

Greg Northrup from USA comes to the following result:
It would be unfortunate to dismiss Neuschwanstein as simply another Genesis rip-off, considering that aside from the uncanny vocal similarity to Peter Gabriel, there is just so much more to this music. […] The main thing about the album is that though they sound a hell of a lot like Genesis, it's by no means a "second-tier" imitation. The musical vibe here is very similar to Wind & Wuthering, or perhaps even vintage Camel, with its warm romanticism and grandiose textures. […] However, the lyrics lack the kind of humorous, wry narrative that Gabriel is known for, instead locking in with the musical palette for a somber, darkly romantic vibe. In fact, the lyrics are usually delivered in an incomprehensible warble, and what does usually pop up doesn't sound particularly important anyway. […] In fact, the vocals are probably the most negligible part of this album, and most of the weight is definitely carried by the instrumental side. […] A very exciting and impeccably preformed album if you can get past the vocals (or if a Gabriel clone doesn't bother you).

Xavier Wagner from Brazil finally thinks:
[Even if] it sounds like Genesis, it is also possible to affirm that if it was recorded by them it would be among their best records. […] As a conclusion I also wonder where Genesis would have reached if they had managed to keep the average of their first records and released albums like this "Battlement". Maybe this is a case of the student surpassing the master (if we consider Genesis' early days, obviously not; but if we talk about their latest records, no doubt). […] For those who don't know it, you can believe it, "Battlement" is one of the greatest moments of progressive rock of all times, pity that it was released in the wrong place and at the wrong time, after all 1979 was not a great moment for the style.

Sources

References

External links 
 
 
 

1979 debut albums
Progressive rock albums by German artists